Daniel Baird Wallace (born June 5, 1952) is an American professor of New Testament Studies at Dallas Theological Seminary. He is also the founder and executive director of the Center for the Study of New Testament Manuscripts, the purpose of which is digitizing all known Greek manuscripts of the New Testament via digital photographs.

Early life
Wallace was born in June 1952, in California. He earned his B.A. (1975) from Biola University, and his Th.M. (1979) and Ph.D. (1995) in New Testament studies from Dallas Theological Seminary. He also pursued postdoctoral studies in a variety of places, including in Cambridge at Tyndale House, Christ's College, Clare College, and Westminster College, in Germany at the Institute for New Testament Textual Research, University of Tübingen, and the Bavarian State Library, and in Greece at the National Library in Athens.

Career
Wallace began his academic career teaching at Dallas Seminary from 1979 until 1981 and then at Grace Theological Seminary from 1981 until 1983, before returning to Dallas where he has been tenured since 1995. He published his first edition of Greek Grammar Beyond The Basics in 1996. It has since become a standard work in the field and has been translated into half a dozen languages. Two-thirds of schools that teach the subject use the textbook. He also has served as senior New Testament editor for the NET Bible and has founded the Center for the Study of New Testament Manuscripts. In 2016 he was the president of the Evangelical Theological Society. In 2019 he joined the Committee on Bible Translation which is responsible for the NIV.

Views
Wallace, along with DTS colleague Darrell L. Bock, has been an outspoken critic of the alleged "popular culture" quest to discredit conservative evangelical views of Jesus—including the writings of Elaine Pagels and Bart Ehrman. He is a contributor to the Ehrman Project, a website that critiques the writings of Bart Ehrman. Wallace critiqued Ehrman's Misquoting Jesus: The Story of Who Changed the Bible and Why for misrepresenting commonly held views of textual criticism, especially in Ehrman's view of the "orthodox corruption of Scripture." Wallace and Ehrman dialogued at the Greer-Heard Point-Counterpoint Forum in April 2008, at Southern Methodist University in October 2011, and again at UNC Chapel Hill in February 2012. Wallace is a Presbyterian and a soft cessationist.

"First Century Mark" 

In 2012 Wallace claimed that a recently identified papyrus fragment of the Gospel of Mark had been definitively dated by a leading paleographer to the late first century, and would shortly be published by E.J. Brill. The fragment might consequently be the earliest surviving Christian text. This claim resulted in widespread speculation on social media and in the press as to the fragment's content, provenance, and date, exacerbated by Wallace's inability to give any further details due to a non-disclosure agreement.  The fragment, designated Papyrus 137 and subsequently dated by its editors to the later 2nd or earlier 3rd century, was eventually published in 2018, in the series of Oxyrhynchus Papyri LXXXIII.  After the publication, Daniel Wallace confirmed that Papyrus 137 was indeed the fragment that he had been referring to, and that he had signed a non-disclosure agreement at the request of Jerry Pattengale, then representing the Museum of the Bible in its efforts to purchase this particular fragment; efforts that proved unavailing, as all the time it had been in the ownership of the Egypt Exploration Society, and had not legitimately been offered for sale.

Works

Books

Chapters

Journal articles

 - (reprint of article in Homer Kent’s Festschrift [see above])

References

Further reading
 "The Bible Hunters," National Geographic (Dec. 2018), pp. 70–75.

External links
 
 
 
 
 
 
 

Living people
Writers from California
Biola University alumni
American Christian writers
American biblical scholars
Christian apologists
1952 births
Scholars of Koine Greek
Dallas Theological Seminary alumni
Dallas Theological Seminary faculty
Grammarians of Ancient Greek
New Testament scholars
Christian bloggers